Liu Guozheng (Simplified Chinese: 刘国正, March 7, 1980 in Hubei) is a retired Chinese table tennis player,  From 2000 to 2005 he won several medals in singles, doubles, and team events in the Asian Table Tennis Championships and in the World Table Tennis Championships.

References

Chinese male table tennis players
Living people
Asian Games medalists in table tennis
Olympic table tennis players of China
Table tennis players at the 2000 Summer Olympics
1980 births
Table tennis players at the 2002 Asian Games
Table tennis players from Wuhan
Medalists at the 2002 Asian Games
Asian Games gold medalists for China
Universiade gold medalists for China
Universiade medalists in table tennis
Medalists at the 2001 Summer Universiade